John Bruce Dollison was a newspaper editor and politician from Logan, Ohio, United States.

Biography
Dollison was born January 11, 1869, on a farm near Logan, Ohio.  He graduated from Logan High School, and from Zanesville Business College.

Dollison obtained skills as a printer, and in 1893 became printer and editor of the Democrat-Sentinel in Logan.  It was the only Democratic newspaper in Hocking County, and Dollison served as editor for over 20 years.  In 1904, he married Alberta Devore, and they had a son and a daughter.

Dollison served as mayor of Logan "for several years".  In 1912, Dollison was elected as a Democrat to the Ohio Senate, representing the Ninth-Fourteenth Senatorial District.  Dollison served two terms in the senate, where his efforts were directed towards labor legislation, serving as Chairman of the Labor Committee.

Dollison died March 7, 1949, at his home in Columbus, Ohio, and was buried at Oak Grove Cemetery in Logan.

References

1869 births
1949 deaths
20th-century American politicians
Democratic Party Ohio state senators
Editors of Ohio newspapers
People from Logan, Ohio